Valeri Petrov (pseudonym of Valeri Nisim Mevorah (Валери Нисим Меворах); 22 April 1920 – 27 August 2014), was a popular Bulgarian poet, screenplay writer, playwright and translator of paternal Jewish origin.

Early life
Born in the capital Sofia to lawyer Nisim Mevorah (and Bulgarian ambassador to the USA in 1945–47 and representative to the UN) and high-school French teacher Mariya Petrova, Valeri Petrov studied at the Italian School in the city, finishing in 1939. He graduated in medicine from Sofia University in 1944.

Languages
Valeri Petrov was fluent in Bulgarian, English, Russian, German, Italian and Spanish. His English language was at such a high level that he translated the complete works of Shakespeare. He probably knew also French (since his mother was a French language teacher) and Hebrew.

Poet and playwright
When he was 15, Petrov published his first independent book: the poem Ptitsi kam sever ("Birds Northwards"). In this and subsequent publications he used his non-Jewish mother's surname or other pseudonyms because of the pro-Nazi regime in Bulgaria at the time. He later wrote the poems Palechko ("Tom Thumb"), Na pat ("En route"), Juvenes dum sumus, Kray sinyoto more ("By the Blue Sea"), Tavanski spomen (A Reminiscence from an Attic) and the series Nezhnosti ("Endearments").

In 1978, Petrov wrote the children's musical Button for Sleep. He is particularly esteemed for the quality of his translation of the entire works of Shakespeare - the authoritative rendition of the Bard in Bulgarian.

Journalist
In the autumn and winter of 1944, when Bulgaria switched sides and joined the Allies in the Second World War, Valeri Petrov worked first at Radio Sofia and then as a wartime writer with the newspaper Frontovak ("Front Fighter"). Following the war, he was among the founders of the humoristic newspaper Starshel ("The Hornet") and its assistant editor-in-chief (1945–1962). He served as a doctor in a military hospital and in the Rila Monastery.

Between 1947 and 1950, Petrov worked in the Bulgarian legation in Rome as a press and cultural attache. During the time he travelled to the United States, Switzerland and France, delegating to various forums.

He was also an editor in a film studio and in the Balgarski pisatel publishing house. He served as a deputy in the Grand National Assembly. Since 2003, he was an academician of the Bulgarian Academy of Sciences. Politically, he was a leftist and a socialist since his schooling in the Third Bulgarian Kingdom, through the Communist period, and until his death.

Death
On 27 August 2014, Petrov died from a stroke in a Sofia hospital. He was 94.

Works
 1944 — Naroden Sad ("People's Court"), communist odes dedicated to killing people opposing the communist regime
 1945 — Stari neshta malko po novomu ("Old stuff in a somewhat new way", poetical series
 1949 — Stihotvoreniya ("Poems"), a book of poetry
 1956 — screenplay for the film Tochka parva ("Item One")
 1958 — Kniga za Kitay ("A Book about China"), travel notes
 1958 — screenplay for the film Na malkiya ostrov ("On the Small Island")
 1960 — V mekata esen ("In the Mild Autumn"), a poem; awarded the Dimitrov Award
 1962 — Improvizatsiya ("Improvisation"), a stage play co-written with Radoy Ralin
 1962 — Poemi, a collection of poems
 1962 — screenplay for the film Slantseto i syankata ("The Sun and the Shadow")
 1965 — Kogato rozite tantsuvat ("When Roses Dance"), a stage play
 1965 — Afrikanski belezhnik ("An African Notebook"), travel notes
 1966 — screenplay for the film Ritsar bez bronya ("A Knight without an Armour")
 1970 — Na smyah ("In Jest"), satirical poems
 1970–1971 — translations of Shakespeare's Comedies, two volumes
 1973–1974 — translations of Shakespeare's Tragedies, two volumes
 1977 — Byala prikazka ("A White Fairy Tale")
 1978 — Kopche za san ("A Dream Button")
 1981 — screenplay for the film Yo Ho Ho - later adapted into the 2006 film The Fall
 1986 — Pet prikazki ("Five Fairy Tales")
 1990 — Selected Works, two volumes

Honours
Petrov Ridge in Graham Land, Antarctica is named after Valeri Petrov.

References

External links
 
 

Website about Valeri Petrov 

Writers from Sofia
20th-century Bulgarian poets
Bulgarian satirists
Bulgarian male poets
Bulgarian translators
1920 births
2014 deaths
Bulgarian people of Jewish descent
Members of the National Assembly (Bulgaria)
Members of the Bulgarian Academy of Sciences
Translators from English
Translators of William Shakespeare
Bulgarian Sephardi Jews
Sofia University alumni
Bulgarian communists
Bulgarian expatriates in Italy